Michael Doyle (25 November 1946 – 27 June 2011) was an English footballer, who spent most of his career with Manchester City and also played for Stoke City, Bolton Wanderers and Rochdale.

Career
Ashton-born Doyle played for Stockport Boys as a junior, joining Manchester City in May 1962. At youth level, Doyle played at right back, but after breaking into the first team he was used in a number of roles. He made his senior debut against Cardiff City in March 1965, playing wing-half, which was followed by a number of appearances as a forward. However, most of his appearances later in his career were in central defence.

Doyle won 5 caps for the England national football team and 8 England Under-23 caps. At club level he played 448 league games for Manchester City, scoring 32 goals, and was voted the club's hardest player in the club's official magazine. He scored for City in the 1970 League Cup Final win over West Bromwich Albion, and captained the side in the 1976 League Cup Final.

Doyle made a total of 570 appearances for Manchester City, scoring 41 goals, before joining Alan Durban's Stoke City for a fee of £50,000 in June 1978. He slotted into the Stoke defence with ease and was played in 46 matches in 1978–79 as Stoke gained promotion to the First Division, and was part of the defence which kept 21 clean sheets. Stoke fought off relegation in 1979–80 and Doyle was then a regular in 1980–81 making 40 appearances as Stoke finished in mid-table. Following the departure of Durban to Sunderland, Doyle was not wanted by new manager Richie Barker and left for Bolton Wanderers in January 1982. He spent a season and a half at Burnden Park and ended his career with a season at Rochdale.

After football
Mike continued to attend Manchester City games regularly after his retirement as a player, but also became a heavy drinker after his playing days were over. In 2007, he attended the Sporting Chance Clinic which helped him give up alcohol for a short time. He died on 27 June 2011 of liver failure after several weeks of treatment in Tameside General Hospital.

Tributes to Doyle were made by his former clubs Manchester City, Stoke City and Bolton Wanderers.

Personal life
Doyle's son, Scott Doyle, is married to Charlotte, the daughter of former teammate Glyn Pardoe, and his grandson Tommy Doyle plays for Manchester City, and has played for England's U-17 and England's U-16 national side.

Career statistics

Club
Source:

A.  The "Other" column constitutes appearances and goals in the Anglo-Italian Cup, Anglo-Scottish Cup, FA Community Shield, Football League Trophy and Texaco Cup.

International
Source:

Honours

Club
 Manchester City
 Football League Second Division champion: 1965–66
 Football League First Division champion: 1967–68
 FA Cup winner 1969
 UEFA Cup Winners' Cup winner: 1970
 Football League Cup winner: 1970 & 1976
 FA Charity Shield winner: 1968 & 1972

 Stoke City
 Football League Second Division third-place promotion: 1978–79

Individual
 Manchester City Player of the Year: 1971, 1974
 Stoke City Player of the Year: 1979

References

External links
 Obituary in The Guardian
 Obituary in The Independent

1946 births
2011 deaths
Deaths from liver failure
Alcohol-related deaths in England
English footballers
England international footballers
England under-23 international footballers
Manchester City F.C. players
Stoke City F.C. players
Bolton Wanderers F.C. players
Rochdale A.F.C. players
Footballers from Ashton-under-Lyne
English Football League players
English Football League representative players
Association football midfielders
Association football defenders
FA Cup Final players